Git (also Romanized as Gīt) is a village in Qohestan Rural District, Qohestan District, Darmian County, South Khorasan Province, Iran. At the 2006 census, its population was 457 with 130 families.

References 

Populated places in Darmian County